Orthogonius sinuatiphallus is a species of ground beetle in the subfamily Orthogoniinae, found in China. It was described by Tian & Deuve in 2001.

References

sinuatiphallus
Beetles described in 2001